State Route 59 (SR 59) is a primary state highway in the U.S. state of Virginia.  The state highway runs  from SR 47 in Drakes Branch east to SR 40 in Keysville within eastern Charlotte County.

Route description

SR 59 begins at an intersection with SR 47 (Main Street) in the northern part of the town of Drakes Branch opposite Saxkey Road.  The state highway heads northeast from SR 47 as Gethsemane Church Avenue, then becomes unnamed after leaving the town limits.  SR 59 follows the height of land between Twittys Creek to the south and Ash Camp Creek to the north; both streams empty into Roanoke Creek west of Drakes Branch.  The state highway begins to parallel a Norfolk Southern Railway rail line as it approaches Keysville.  SR 59 enters the town of Keysville as Merry Oaks Drive then reaches its northern terminus at SR 40 (Church Street) west of downtown Keysville.

History
Until 1957, when it was transferred from the secondary system, SR 59 was State Route 657. The number 657 is now used on Bradner Road, a minor 0.8-mile (1.3 km) dead-end street off SR 649 east of Phenix.

Major intersections

References

External links

Virginia Highways Project: VA 59

059
State Route 059